Houldsworth Working Men's Club is a club in Stockport, Greater Manchester, England. Designed by the famed Alfred Waterhouse and completed in the late 19th century, it is still used as a working men's club today. An important local structure, it is now a Grade II* listed building.

See also

 Grade II* listed buildings in Greater Manchester
 Listed buildings in Stockport

References

External links

Grade II* listed buildings in Greater Manchester
Grade II* listed clubhouses
Buildings and structures in Stockport
Clubs and societies in Greater Manchester
Men's club buildings
Clubhouses in the United Kingdom
Working men's clubs
Organisations based in Stockport